Argemma aurea is a species of butterfly in the family Hesperiidae first described by Hamilton Herbert Druce in 1910. It is found in Cameroon, the Republic of the Congo, the Democratic Republic of the Congo and Uganda. The habitat consists of forests.

References

Butterflies described in 1910
Hesperiinae